Ring Route may refer to:

 A ring road or beltway
 Ring Route (Nagoya Expressway)
 City Ring Route, Adelaide
 Western Ring Route